Francisco Gutierrez Diaz Jr., better known by his screen name Joko Diaz, is a Filipino actor. Throughout his career, he has won two FAP Awards and is three-time FAMAS Award nominee. He is best known for his antagonist portrayals and action movie lead roles.

Career
Diaz began his acting career in 1984. In 1998, he became a talent of Viva Films, where he initially starred in teen comedy films, such as Estudyante Blues (1989) and Teacher's Enemy No. 1 (1990). He also had a special role in the 1988 film Boy Negro, where he portrayed the young titular character.

In 1992, he was launched under Viva's action stable through Angelito San Miguel at ang mga Batang City Jail and since bagged either co-lead or supporting roles in various action films, such as Blue Jeans Gang (1992), Pita (1993) and Brat Pack (1994). In 1995, he was launched into stardom with the biopic The Grepor Butch Belgica Story, where he portrayed the titular role. Since then, he became among the country's action stars at that time, bagging mostly lead roles in various action films, such as Masamang Damo (1996), Anak ni Boy Negro (1997), Squala (1998) and Sugo ng Tondo (2000).

Since 2009, he bags supporting roles in various TV series, notably villain roles.

Personal life
Diaz is married to his non-showbiz wife, Abigail, with whom he has two children: Ashley and Pacquie. He has another daughter, Nicole de Leon, from a previous relationship with actress Angelu de Leon.

He studied at the Adamson University. He played a former high school basketball team of FEU-D Baby Tamaraws.

Filmography

Film

Television

References

External links
 

Filipino people of Mexican descent
Filipino people of Kapampangan descent
Filipino people of Spanish descent
ABS-CBN personalities
GMA Network personalities
21st-century Filipino male actors
21st-century Filipino politicians
Living people
Joko
Adamson University alumni
Year of birth missing (living people)